Deakin Law School is a school of law associated with Deakin University, operating at campuses in Geelong, Melbourne and  Warrnambool in Australia.

It offers a four-year Bachelor of Laws (LLB) degree. The School also offers postgraduate education, namely Master of Accounting and Law, Master of Laws (LLM) by coursework or research and the Juris Doctor (JD).

Research
Deakin Law School has over 50 academic, research staff and PhD candidates, and over 30 HDR candidates.

Publication
Deakin Law School produced the Deakin Law Review, which was founded in 1993 and ceased publication in 2019.

See also
 List of law schools in Australia

References

External links
Deakin Law School

Law schools in Australia
Education in Geelong
Deakin University